Jones v. Alfred H. Mayer Co., 392 U.S. 409 (1968), is a landmark United States Supreme Court case, which held that Congress could regulate the sale of private property to prevent racial discrimination: "[] bars all racial discrimination, private as well as public, in the sale or rental of property, and that the statute, thus construed, is a valid exercise of the power of Congress to enforce the Thirteenth Amendment."

Reversing many precedents, the Supreme Court held that the Civil Rights Act of 1866 prohibited both private and state-backed discrimination and that the 13th Amendment authorized Congress to prohibit private acts of discrimination as among "the badges and incidents of slavery." Congress possessed the power to "determine what are the badges and incidents of slavery, and the authority to translate that determination into effective legislation."

See also
List of United States Supreme Court cases, volume 392
Shelley v. Kraemer (1948), private landowners racial discrimination case

References

Further reading 
  Pdf.

External links
 

United States Supreme Court cases
United States Supreme Court cases of the Warren Court
United States Thirteenth Amendment case law
1968 in United States case law
American Civil Liberties Union litigation
Implied statutory cause of action case law
Civil rights movement case law
African-American history of Missouri
United States racial discrimination case law